Elvis Ángel Figueroa Pinel (born 18 December 1988) is a Nicaraguan professional midfielder currently playing for Real Estelí.

International career
Figueroa made his debut for Nicaragua in a January 2011 Copa Centroamericana match against El Salvador and has, as of July 2017, earned a total of 30 caps, scoring 1 goal. He has represented his country in 2 FIFA World Cup qualification matches and played at the 2011 and 2013 Copa Centroamericana.

International goals
Scores and results list Honduras' goal tally first.

References

External links
 
 

1988 births
Living people
Association football midfielders
Nicaraguan men's footballers
Nicaragua international footballers
Real Estelí F.C. players
2011 Copa Centroamericana players
2013 Copa Centroamericana players
2014 Copa Centroamericana players
2017 Copa Centroamericana players
2017 CONCACAF Gold Cup players